Below is a list of Romanian language exonyms for towns and villages in the Vojvodina region of Serbia (Romanian names are in parentheses).

A
Alibunar (Alibunar)
Apatin (Apatin)

B
Bač (Baci)
Banatsko Novo Selo (Satu Nou)
Barice (Barite, Sân Ianăş)
Bašaid (Bășăid)
Bavanište (Bavaniște)
Bečej Becei
Begejci (Torac)
Bela Crkva (Biserica Albă)
Boka (Boca)

D
Deliblato (Deliblata)
Dolovo (Doloave)

E
Ečka (Ecica, Iecica Română)

G
Glogonj (Glogoni)
Grebenac (Grebenaț)

H
Hajdučica (Haiducița)

I
Ilandža (Ilangea)
Izbište (Izbiște)

J
Jablanka (Iablanca)
Jabuka (Iabuca)
Jankov Most (Iancaid, Iancov Most)
Jaša Tomić (Modoș)

K
Kikinda (Chichinda Mare)
Klek (Clec)
Konak (Conac)
Kovačica (Covăciţa)
Kovin (Cuvin)
Kuštilj (Coșteiu)

L
Lokve (Locve, Sânmihai)

M
Mali Žam (Jamu Mic)
Malo Središte (Srediștea Mică)
Margita (Mărghita)
Markovac (Marcovăţ)
Međa (Pardani)
Mesić (Mesici)
Mramorak (Mramorac)

N
Nikolinci (Nicolinți)
Novi Kneževac (Noul Cnezat)
Novi Sad (Novi Sad)
Novo Miloševo (Beodra)

O
Omoljica (Omolița)
Opovo (Opovo)
Orešac (Oreșaț)

P
Pančevo (Panciova)
Pavliš (Păuliș)
Plandište (Plandiște)

R
Ritiševo (Râtișor)

S
Samoš (Samoș)
Sečanj (Seceani)
Seleuš (Seleuș)
Senta (Zenta)
Sočica (Sălcița)
Straža (Straja)
Sutjeska (Sărcia)

T
Torak (Torac)
Torda (Turda)
Turija (Turia)

U
Uzdin (Ozora)

V
Velike Livade (Livada Mare)
Veliko Središte (Srediştea Mare)
Vladimirovac (Vladimirovăț)
Vlajkovac (Vlaicovăț)
Vojvodinci (Voivodinț)
Vršac (Vârșeț)

Z
Zrenjanin (Becicherecul Mare)

Ž
Žitište (Jitiște)

See also
Romanian exonyms
List of European exonyms
List of cities, towns and villages in Vojvodina

Voj
Romanian exonyms in Vojvodina
Romanian